The following games were initially announced as PlayStation Portable titles, however were subsequently cancelled or postponed indefinitely by developers or publishers.

References

Portable cancelled games

PlayStation Portable